Arthur William Allen Harker CBE (7 September 1890 – 23 January 1960) was a British soldier who served in both World Wars, and in the latter was a Brigadier in the Royal Army Ordnance Corps.

He was the son of James Allen Harker, professor at the Royal Agricultural College, Cirencester and his wife Lizzie Allen Harker.  His older brother was Oswald Allen Harker, later Deputy Director General of MI5.  He was educated at Cheltenham College and the Royal Military Academy, Woolwich.

In 1919 he married Mabel Violet Jeans, daughter of Maj. Gen. Charles Gilchrist Jeans CB.  They had no children.

He was appointed CBE in 1941.

References

External links
British Army Officer Histories 1939-1945
Generals of World War II

1890 births
1960 deaths
Commanders of the Order of the British Empire
British Army personnel of World War I
British Army brigadiers of World War II
Royal Army Ordnance Corps officers
Graduates of the Royal Military Academy, Woolwich
H